Saint Matthias of Jerusalem (died 120 AD) was a 2nd-century Christian saint and a Bishop of Jerusalem, whose episcopacy was about 113–120 AD.

Matthew was probably bishop for few years after Tobias until 120. During his episcopacy, he dealt with a troubled political situation due to Roman persecution of Christians and a Jewish uprising. According to Eusebius of Caesarea he was a Jewish Christian. He was persecuted by Emperor Hadrian (117–138), but died peacefully about 120AD.

Notes

120 deaths
Saints from the Holy Land
2nd-century Christian saints
2nd-century bishops of Jerusalem
Year of birth unknown